She's in Portland is a 2020 American comedy drama film directed by Marc Carlini and written by Carlini and Patrick Alexander. It stars Tommy Dewey, François Arnaud and Minka Kelly.

She's in Portland had its world premiere at the Santa Barbara International Film Festival on January 16, 2020. It was released on September 25, 2020, on digital and on demand.

Plot 
Two college friends, now in their thirties, admire each other's lives and feel trapped in their own. Wes, tied to a demanding career and responsibilities to family, extends a work trip to drag his dispirited artist friend Luke to find Luke's "one that got away".

Cast
 Tommy Dewey as Wes
 Paige Spara as Mallory
 François Arnaud as Luke
 Minka Kelly as Sarah Hill
 Joelle Carter as Rebecca
 Lola Glaudini as Ellen

Soundtrack
The score soundtrack album of the film was composed by Mondo Boys. It was released on October 9, 2020.

Reception

References

External links
 
 

2020 films
2020 comedy-drama films
American comedy-drama films
Films set in Portland, Oregon
2020s English-language films
2020s American films